Sombala Kumar is a Dhrupad vocalist of India. She studied with Ustad Zia Fariduddin Dagar, a singer of the 19th generation of the dynasty of Dagar Gharana. She also studied with Ustad Zia Mohiuddin Dagar.

Career 
Kumar first Shri. M.D. Raje and Shri. M.K.Kwathekar of Khandwa. Sombala Kumar holds a master's degree in Classical Music from Dr. Hari Singh Gaur University, Sagar (M.P.). Thereafter, she got a scholarship for four years from Ustad Allaudin Khan Sangeet Academy, Bhopal to learn Dhrupad. She then studied with Ud. Zia Fariduddin Dagar. Sombala Kumar has been a visiting fellow and visiting professor at Indira Kala Sangeet University, Khairagarh.

Living people
Hindustani singers
Dagarvani
Women Hindustani musicians
Indian women classical singers
Singers from Madhya Pradesh
Women musicians from Madhya Pradesh
Year of birth missing (living people)